Valiant Hearts may refer to:
Valiant Hearts: The Great War, 2014 puzzle adventure video game
Cœurs Vaillants ("Brave Hearts"), 1929–1981 Catholic French language weekly newspaper for French children